The Netsuite Open 2013 is the 2013's Netsuite Open, which is a tournament of the PSA World Tour event International (Prize money: $70,000). The event took place at the Standford Squash in San Francisco in the United States from 25 September to 1 October. Ramy Ashour won his first Netsuite Open trophy, beating Grégory Gaultier in the final.

Prize money and ranking points
For 2013, the prize purse was $70,000. The prize money and points breakdown is as follows:

Seeds

Draw and results

See also
PSA World Tour 2013
Netsuite Open

References

External links
PSA Netsuite Open 2013 website
Netsuite Open official website

Netsuite Open
Netsuite Open Squash
2013 in American sports
2013 in squash